Warrigal Road is a major inner urban road in southeastern Melbourne, Australia. On weekdays, it is heavily trafficked as it runs through many major suburbs along its route, traversing some of Melbourne's eastern and south-eastern suburbs. These suburbs include Chadstone, Oakleigh, and Cheltenham. The Chadstone Shopping Centre can be accessed directly from Warrigal Road at its eastern entrance.

Route
Warrigal Road begins at the intersection with Canterbury Road in Surrey Hills and runs south as a four-lane, single-carriageway road with a speed limit at 60 km/h, up and down steep gradients, through the intersection with Toorak Road and Burwood Highway at Burwood (where the highway declaration starts) and continues south to the intersection with High Street Road at Ashwood, where the road widens to a six-lane, dual-carriageway road with bus lanes. Continuing south, it crosses under the Glen Waverley railway line (where the bus lanes end) and the Monash Freeway in Chadstone to the intersection with Princes Highway. Continuing south as a four-lane, single-carriageway road, it crosses over the Pakenham railway line through Oakleigh until the intersection of Old Dandenong Road, Oakleigh South, where it widens again to a six-lane, dual-carriageway road with a speed limit of 70 km/h and continues south through Heatherton until Bernard Street, where it narrows again to a four-lane, single-carriageway road and the speed limit is reduced back to 60 km/h. Continuing south, it passes through Nepean Highway in Mentone (where the highway declaration ends), where it narrows again to a dual-lane, single-carriageway road, crosses the Frankston railway line, before eventually terminating at an uncontrolled T-intersection with Beach Road in Parkdale.

History
The Country Roads Board (later VicRoads) declared Warrigal Road a Main Road in the 1937–38 financial year, from Canterbury Road in Surrey Hills to Centre Road, Oakleigh South. The bridge over Gardiners Creek at Ashwood was also replaced during this period: the old structure was demolished, and a new bridge was built on an improved alignment with the road immediately downstream of the old one. The new bridge opened on 25 October 1938, for a total cost of approximately A£4,100. It was later widened to take four lanes of traffic in 1958, using the unusual measure of cutting and jacking over to a new position of the footways and hand-rails of the existing structure, and widening the road between them; this procedure cost much less than would have been the cost of demolishing the footway and casting a new section. Construction of a road-over-rail overpass at the level crossing with the Pakenham railway line in Oakleigh, with assistance from Victorian Railways, was completed in the 1967–68 financial year.

Warrigal Road was signed as Metropolitan Route 15 between Surrey Hills and Parkdale in 1965. Metropolitan Route 14 previously ran concurrent along Warrigal Road from South Road at Oakleigh South to Kingston Road at Heatherton from 1989; this was removed when Metropolitan Route 14 was re-routed along Dingley Bypass when it opened in 2016.

The passing of the Transport Act of 1983 (itself an evolution from the original Highways and Vehicles Act of 1924) provided for the declaration of State Highways, roads two-thirds financed by the State government through the Road Construction Authority (later VicRoads). The Warrigal Highway was declared a State Highway in December 1990, from the South Eastern Arterial at Chadstone to the Nepean Highway in Mentone, and was extended north from the South Eastern Arterial to Burwood Highway at Burwood in October 1993; the road was known (and signposted) as Warrigal Road along its entire length.

The passing of the Road Management Act 2004 granted the responsibility of overall management and development of Victoria's major arterial roads to VicRoads: in 2004, VicRoads re-declared the road as Warrigal Highway (Arterial #6070), beginning at Burwood Highway at Burwood and ending at Nepean Highway in Mentone, while re-declaring the remnants between Surrey Hills and Parkdale as Warrigal Road (Arterial #5843) The road is still presently known (and signposted) as Warrigal Road along its entire length.

Etymology
The name Warrigal refers to a wild dingo in the Darug language.

Major Intersections

See also

References

 1945.melbourne
 http://melwayed1.melway.com.au/mwyedn1.htm

Highways and freeways in Melbourne
Streets in Melbourne
Cheltenham, Victoria
Transport in the City of Boroondara
Transport in the City of Whitehorse
Transport in the City of Monash
Transport in the City of Stonnington
Transport in the City of Glen Eira
Transport in the City of Kingston (Victoria)